Gurdwara Lal Khoohi (The Bloody Well), alternatively Gurdwara Lal Khooh or Lal Khoo, literally Gurdwara Well of Blood was a historical Gurdwara located near Mochi Gate in Lahore, Pakistan.

Historical significance

It was built at the site where the fifth Sikh Guru, Guru Arjan Dev, was incarcerated during the reign of the Mughal Emperor, Jehangir.

Conversion to muslim shrine
It has since been converted into a Muslim shrine, Haq Char Yaar, in reference to the first four caliphs in Islam. In 2007, Shiromani Gurdwara Parbandhak Committee condemned this act by muslims.

Gallery

See also
Conversion of non-Islamic places of worship into mosques
Gurdwara Shaheed Bhai Taru Singh

References

External links
Official website

Gurdwaras
Religious buildings and structures in Lahore
Gurdwaras in Pakistan
Architecture of Lahore
Tourist attractions in Lahore
Buildings and structures in Lahore
Religious buildings and structures converted into mosques
19th-century gurdwaras